Richard Barnes (1849 - 30 April 1902) was an Australian cricketer. He played two first-class matches between 1870 and 1873, one for Tasmania and one for the Rest of Australia XI.

See also
 List of Tasmanian representative cricketers

References

1849 births
1902 deaths
Australian cricketers
Tasmania cricketers
Cricketers from Tasmania